SecureWare Inc., founded in 1986 developed software and encryption technology for securing Unix-based operating systems. Its secure operating system was used to help secure the world's first internet bank, Security First Network Bank (S1 Technologies). SecureWare also worked closely with HP's federal division to develop security products, such as the trusted operating system, used by the U.S. Department of Defense for certain military information.

In 1996, SecureWare's internet system security division was sold to Hewlett Packard. The rest of SecureWare was acquired by Security First Network Bank later that same year.

References

 http://findarticles.com/p/articles/mi_m0EIN/is_1995_Dec_4/ai_17799106/ 
 "SecureWare sells Internet system security to HP, concentrates on Internet application security.."  The Free Library. 1996 Business Wire 19 Feb. 2016

Defunct software companies of the United States
Computer security software companies
Hewlett-Packard acquisitions
American companies established in 1986